The Journal of Systematic Palaeontology (Print: ,) is a peer-reviewed scientific journal of palaeontology published by Taylor & Francis on behalf of the British Natural History Museum.  , the editor-in-chief is Paul D. Taylor.

The journal covers papers on new or poorly known faunas and floras and new approaches to systematics. It was established in 2003. According to the Journal Citation Reports, the journal has a 2014 impact factor of 3.727, ranking it second out of 49 journals in the category 'Paleontology'.

References

External links 
 

Paleontology journals
Taylor & Francis academic journals
Quarterly journals
Publications established in 2003
English-language journals